The 2018–19 season was Ohod's second consecutive season in Pro League and their 83rd year in existence. This season Ohod participated in the Pro League and King Cup. 

The season covers the period from 1 July 2018 to 30 June 2019.

Players

Squad information

Out on loan

Transfers

In

Loans in

Out

Loans out

Competitions

Overall

Last Updated: 16 May 2019

Pro League

League table

Results summary

Results by round

Matches
All times are local, AST (UTC+3).

King Cup

All times are local, AST (UTC+3).

Statistics

Squad statistics
Last updated on 16 May 2019.

|-
! colspan=14 style=background:#dcdcdc; text-align:center|Goalkeepers

|-
! colspan=14 style=background:#dcdcdc; text-align:center|Defenders

|-
! colspan=14 style=background:#dcdcdc; text-align:center|Midfielders

|-
! colspan=14 style=background:#dcdcdc; text-align:center|Forwards

|-
! colspan=14 style=background:#dcdcdc; text-align:center| Players sent out on loan this season

|-
! colspan=14 style=background:#dcdcdc; text-align:center| Player who made an appearance this season but have left the club

|}

Goalscorers

Last Updated: 16 May 2019

Assists

Last Updated: 16 May 2019

Clean sheets

Last Updated: 16 May 2019

References

Ohod